"King of Wishful Thinking" (titled "The King of Wishful Thinking" on Chrysalis releases) is a song by British pop duo Go West, written by Peter Cox, Richard Drummie and Martin Page. It was featured in the film Pretty Woman and appeared on its soundtrack. It was later featured on Go West's third studio album, Indian Summer, in 1992.

In terms of the group's discography, "King of Wishful Thinking" has become their best known song. The track reached number three in Canada, number six in Australia, number eight in the United States, and number 18 in the United Kingdom. At the 1991 Brit Awards the song was nominated for the Brit Award for British Video of the Year.

The song's official music video is known for featuring various absurdist elements alongside the pop duo as they act on a solid white stage. 

In 2018, actor Paul Rudd and late-night host Jimmy Fallon made a shot-for-shot recreation of the music video for The Tonight Show. Some elements such as a dancing Pope, zebras, and a trained circus elephant, present in the original video, were not reproduced in the remake. American band the Roots made a cameo appearance.

Critical reception
Music journalist Hannah Dailey of the U.S. publication Billboard has labeled the song as "one of the crown jewels of ’90s classic hits".

Track listings
UK 7-inch and cassette single
 "The King of Wishful Thinking" – 4:00
 "Tears Too Late" – 4:25

UK CD single
 "The King of Wishful Thinking" – 4:00
 "The King of Wishful Thinking" (Jon Gass US 12-inch) – 5:49
 "Tears Too Late" – 4:25
 "The King of Wishful Thinking" (acapella) – 2:45
 The UK 12-inch single switches tracks one and two.

US and Canadian cassette single
 "King of Wishful Thinking" (LP version)
 "King of Wishful Thinking" (power mix)

Charts

Weekly charts

Year-end charts

Certifications

See also
 1990 in music

References

External links
 

1990 singles
1990 songs
Chrysalis Records singles
EMI Records singles
Go West (band) songs
Song recordings produced by Peter Wolf (producer)
Songs written by Peter Cox (musician)
Songs written by Martin Page
Songs written by Richard Drummie
Songs written for films